Looking Glass Township is one of fifteen townships in Clinton County, Illinois, USA.  As of the 2010 census, its population was 6,354 and it contained 2,439 housing units.

Geography

Cities, towns, villages
 Albers
 Damiansville
 New Baden (partial)

Unincorporated towns
 New Memphis
 New Memphis Station
 Wertenberg
(This list is based on USGS data and may include former settlements.)

Cemeteries
The township contains these four cemeteries: Green Mount, Harpstrite, New Baden and Saint Bernard.

Major highways
  Interstate 64
  Illinois Route 160
  Illinois Route 161
  Illinois Route 177

Airports and landing strips
 Fischers RLA Airport

Rivers
 Kaskaskia River

Lakes
 Broeckling Lake
 Cooper Lake
 Little Cooper Lake
 Long Lake
 Muskrat Lake
 Queens Lake

Demographics

School districts
 Wesclin Community Unit School District 3

Political districts
 Illinois's 15th congressional district
 State House District 108
 State Senate District 54

References
 
 United States Census Bureau 2007 TIGER/Line Shapefiles
 United States National Atlas

External links
 City-Data.com
 Illinois State Archives

Townships in Clinton County, Illinois
Townships in Illinois